Apechtes championi is a species of beetle in the family Cerambycidae. It was described by Bates in 1881. It is known from Guatemala and Honduras.

References

Colobotheini
Beetles described in 1881